Peter J. Davies (30 December 1925 – 18 February 2014) was a Welsh rugby union, and professional rugby league footballer who played in the 1940s and 1950s, and rugby union administrator. He played club level rugby union (RU) for Ebbw Bridge Junction RFC and Newport RFC (vice-captain to Roy Burnett), in the back row, e.g. flanker, or number eight, i.e. number 6 or 7, or 8, and club level rugby league (RL) for Leigh (Heritage No. 635), as a goal-kicking player, he was later chairman, and then president, of Pill Harriers RFC,

Background
Peter Davies' birth was registered in Newport, Wales, Wales, he worked as a docker, he and his wife Gwen were the landlords of the Brown Cow public house in Warrington, and later The Railway Hotel public house in Leigh, and he died aged 88 in Newport, Wales, his funeral took place at St Stephen's Church, Pillgwenlly at 11:00am on Monday 10 March 2014.

Club career
Peter J. Davies played his last match for Newport RFC against Newbridge RFC on Saturday 25 April 1953, he made his début for Leigh during October 1953.

Genealogical information
Peter J. Davies' marriage to Gwendoline "Gwen" (née Davies) was registered during second ¼ 1954 in Newport district. They had children; rugby union prop of the 1970s and 1980s for Newport RFC, Peter Davies, Karen V. Davies (birth registered first ¼  in Leigh district), William Glyn Davies (birth registered second ¼  in Leigh district, who was born with Down Syndrome), and Julie Davies. Peter J. Davies was the nephew of George Travers, and the cousin of William 'Bunner' Travers.

References

External links
Search for "Davies" at rugbyleagueproject.org
Biography at blackandambers.co.uk
Funeral Details for Peter J. Davies
History of Newport > The 1946–47 Season
Obituary: Peter Davies

1925 births
2014 deaths
Footballers who switched code
Leigh Leopards players
Newport RFC players
Publicans
Rugby league players from Newport, Wales
Rugby union flankers
Rugby union number eights
Rugby union players from Newport, Wales
Welsh rugby league players
Welsh rugby union players